Karl E. Schedl (1898–1979) was an Austrian entomologist, specialist on Coleoptera and forest zoology. He worked at University of Natural Resources and Life Sciences, Vienna. Over a span of nearly 50 years between 1931 and 1980, Schedl created a total of 69 publications.

Publications

1931
 Schedl, K.E., (1931) Notes on the genus Xyleborus Eichh. Annals and Magazine of Natural History , (10) 8, 339–347.

1934
 Schedl, K.E., (1934) Neue Borkenkäfer. Entomologische Blätter , 30(1), 37–39.

1935
 Schedl, K.E., (1935a) Neue Platypodiden aus Afrika, Neuguinea, Zentral-und Südamerika. Entomologische Nachrichten, 9(3), 149–154, 174–175.
 Schedl, K.E., (1935b) New barkbeetles and ambrosia-beetles (Col.). Stylops, 4(12), 270–276.
 Schedl, K.E., (1935c) Fauna Philippinensis (Platypodidae et Scolytidae), III. Philippine Journal of Science, 56(3), 395–403.
 Schedl, K.E., (1935d) Scolytidae and Platypodidae: new species from the Philippine Islands and Formosa. Philippine Journal of Science, 57(4), 479–489.
 Schedl, K.E., (1935e) Some new Platypodidae from Borneo and Malaya. Journal of the Federated Malay States Museums, 17(4), 632–642.

1936
 Schedl, K.E., (1936a) Notes on Malayan Scolytidae and Platypodidae and descriptions of some new species. Journal of the Federated Malay States Museums, 18(1), 1–18.
 Schedl, K.E., (1936b) Some new Scolytidae and Platypodidae from the Malay Peninsula. Journal of the Federated Malay States Museums, 18(1), 19–35, 1 fig.
 Schedl, K.E., (1936c) Platypodidae des Museo Civico di Storia Naturale di Genova. Annali del Museo Civico di Storia Naturale di Genova, 59, 43–62.
 Schedl, K.E., (1936d) Scolytidae and Platypodidae: Fauna Philippinensis, IV. Philippine Journal of Science, 60(1), 59–67.
 Schedl, K.E., (1936e) Scolytidae and Platypodidae. Contribution 35. The collection of the South Australian Museum. Records of the South Australian Museum, 5(4), 513–535.

1937
 Schedl, K.E., (1937a) Platypodidae des Berliner Zoologischen Museums. Entomologische Blätter , 33(1), 33–44.
 Schedl, K.E., (1937b) Scolytidae und Platypodidae. 34 Contribution. Fauna Borneensis, Part 1. Sarawak Museum Journal, Kuching, 4(4), 543–552.

1938
 Schedl, K.E., (1938a) Scolytidae und Platypodidae. Contribution 49. New species from Australia and the Fiji Islands with some revisional notes. Transactions of Royal Society of South Australia, 62, 34–52.
 Schedl, K.E., (1938b) Scolytidae and Platypodidae: Fauna Philippinensis, V. Philippine Journal of Science, 67(4), 421–429.

1939
 Schedl, K.E., (1939a) Malaysian Scolytidae and Platypodidae (IV). 57 Contribution. Journal of the Federated Malay States Museums, 18(3), 327–364.
 Schedl, K.E., (1939b) Die Einteilung und geographische Verbreitung der Platypodidae. Verhandllungen VII Internationaler Kongreß von Entomologie, 7(1), 377–410.

1940
 Schedl, K.E., (1940) Scolytidae and Platypodidae. 61 Contribution. Annals and Magazine of Natural History , (11) 5(29), 433–442.

1941
 Schedl, K.E., (1941a) Platypodiden und Scolytiden. 43 Beitrag. Revue Française d'Entomologie, 7, 152–157.
 Schedl, K.E., (1941b) Die Variations-Breite in den Platypi cupulati Chap. 73 Beitrag. Archiv für Naturgeschichte, 10(3), 416–426.

1942
 Schedl, K.E., (1942a) Neue Scolytidae aus Java. 76 Beitrag. Tijdschrift voor Entomologie, 85, 1–49.
 Schedl, K.E., (1942b) Interessante und neue Scolytiden und Platypodiden aus der australischen Region. 79 Beitrag. Mitteilungen der Münchener Entomologischen Gesellschaft, 32, 162–201.
 Schedl, K.E., (1942c) Forschungs-Berichte zur Scolytoiden-Fauna der malayischen Halbinsel. V. 80 Beitrag. Kolonialforstliche Mitteilungen Neudamm und Berlin, 5(2–3), 169–218.

1950
 Schedl, K.E., (1950) Neotropical Scolytoidea, II. 107 Contribution. Dusenia, 1(3), 145–180.

1951
 Schedl, K.E., (1951) Fauna Indomalayaensis, I. Tijdschrift voor Entomologie, 93, 41–98.

1952
 Schedl, K.E., (1952) Neotropische Scolytoidea, III. 110 Beitrag. Dusenia, 3(5), 343–366.

1953
 Schedl, K.E., (1953) New Scolytoidea. Queensland Museum Memoirs, 13, 80–83.

1955
 Schedl, K.E., (1955) Borken-und Ambrosiakäfer aus dem Pazifischen Raum. 150 Beitrag. Entomologische Arbeiten aus dem Museum G. Frey, 6, 277–310.

1957
 Schedl, K.E., (1957) Scolytoidea nouveaux du Congo Belge, II. Mission R. Mayne-K.E. Schedl 1952. Annales du Musee Royale du Congo Belge Tervuren (Belgique), Ser. 8, Sciences Zoologiques, 56, 1–162.

1958
 Schedl, K.E., (1958a) Zur Synonymie der Borkenkäfer II. 159 Beitrag. Tijdschrift voor Entomologie, 101(3–4), 141–155.

1960
 Schedl, K.E., (1960) Zur Synonymie der Borkenkäfer V. 181 Beitrag. Entomologische Blätter , 56(2), 103–112.

1962
 Schedl, K.E., (1962a) Scolytidae und Platypodidae aus dem australisch-polynesischen Raum. 206 Beitrag zur Mophologie und Systematik der Scolytoidea. Entomologische Arbeiten aus dem Museum G. Frey, 13(1), 72–78.
 Schedl, K.E., (1962b) Zur Synonymie der Borkenkäfer, X. 213 Beitrag. Mitteilungen der Münchener Entomologischen Gesellschaft, 52, 85–107.
 Schedl, K.E., (1962c) Synonymies of bark beetles, VII. 204 Contribution. Annals and Magazine of Natural History , (13) 4, 697–699.

1964
 Schedl, K.E., (1964a) Scolytoidea from Borneo, III. 185 Contribution. Reichenbachia , 4, 241–254.
 Schedl, K.E., (1964b) On some Coleoptera of economic importance from New Guinea and Australia. Pacific insects , 6(1), 211–214.
 Schedl, K.E., (1964c) Zur Synonymie der Borkenkäfer, XV. 228 Beitrag. Reichenbachia, 3, 303–317.
 Schedl, K.E., (1964d) Neue und interessante Scolytoidea von den Sunda-Inseln, Neue Guinea und Australien. 202 Beitrag. Tijdschrift voor Entomologie, 107(5), 297–306.

1965
 Schedl, K.E., (1965) Scolytidae und Platypodidae aus dem Naturhistorika Riksmuseum in Stockholm. 235 Beitrag. Arkiv för zoologi , (2) 18(3), 17–31.

1966
 Schedl, K.E., (1966a) Pin-hole borers Japanese ports. 241 Contribution to the morphology and taxonomy of the Scolytoidea. Kontyû, 34, 29–43.
 Schedl, K.E., (1966b) Etwas über die Borkenkäfer der Araucarien. 239 Beitrag. Anzeiger für Schädlingskunde, 39(3), 42–45.

1968
 Schedl, K.E., (1968a) On some Scolytidae and Platypodidae of economic importance from the Territory of Papua and New Guinea. 250 Contribution. Pacific Insects, 10(2), 261–270.
 Schedl, K.E., (1968b) Some interesting and new Platypodidae (Coleoptera) from New Guinea. 257 Contribution. Pacific Insects, 10, 535–537.

1969
 Schedl, K.E., (1969a) Scolytidae und Platypodidae aus Neu-Guinea (Coleoptera). 263 Beitrag. Opuscula Zoologica Budapest, 9(1), 155–158.
 Schedl, K.E., (1969b) Further new Scolytoidea from the territory of Papua and Guinea. 267 Contribution. The Proceedings of the Linnean Society of New South Wales, 94(3), 214–236.
 Schedl, K.E., (1969c) Zur Synonymie der Borkenkäfer, XVIII. 253 Beitrag. Entomologische Arbeiten aus dem Museum G. Frey, 20, 79–105.

1970
 Schedl, K.E., (1970a) Another collection of Scolytidae and Platypodidae of economic importance from the Territory of Papua New Guinea, 254 Contribution to the morphology and taxonomy of Scolytoidea. Proceedings of the Linnean Society, New South Wales, 94(2), 128–132.
 Schedl, K.E., (1970b) Bark beetles and pin-hole borers (Scolytidae and Platypodidae) intercepted from imported logs in Japanese ports, IV. 274 Contribution. Kontyû, 38, 353–370.

1971
 Schedl, K.E., (1971a) Scolytidae und Platypodidae aus dem Zoologischen Museum der Universitat in Kopenhagen (Insecta, Coleoptera). Steenstrupia, 1, 145–156.
 Schedl, K.E., (1971b) Indomalayan bark and timber beetles. 276 Contribution. Oriental Insects, 5(3), 361–399.

1972
 Schedl, K.E., 1972: Monographie der Familie Platypodidae Coleoptera. W. Junk, Den Haag, v + 322 pp.
 Schedl, K.E., 1972: New Scolytidae and Platypodidae from the Papuan subregion and New Caledonia, I. 271 Beitrag. Papua New Guinea Agriculture Journal, 23(3–4), 49–60.
 Schedl, K.E., 1972: Scolytidae and Platypodidae from the Papuan subregion and Australia. 279 Beitrag. Papua New Guinea Agriculture Journal, 23(3–4), 61–72.
 Schedl, K.E., 1972: Scolytidae of Ceylon. 287 Contribution. Mitteilungen der Schweizerischen Entomologischen Gesellschaft, 45(1–3), 221–229.
 Schedl, K.E., 1972: Bark and timber beetles of the Pacific Islands. 282 Beitrag. New Zealand Journal of Science, 15(3), 265–272.

1973
 Schedl, K.E., 1973: Scolytidae and Platypodidae of the Archbold Expeditions to New Guinea. 280 Contribution. Papua New Guinea Agricultural Journal, 24(2), 70–77.
 Schedl, K.E., 1973: New Scolytidae and Platypodidae from the Papuan subregion. 299 Contribution to morphology and taxonomy of Scolytoidea. Papua New Guinea Agricultural Journal, 24(3), 87–97.

1974
 Schedl, K.E., 1974: New Scolytidae and Platypodidae from the Papuan subregion and New Caledonia, III. 302 Contribution. Annalen des Naturhistorischen Museums in Wien, 79, 457–472.

1975
 Schedl, K.E., 1975: Zur Synonymie der Borkenkäfer, XXVI. 318 Beitrag. Zeitschrift der Arbeitsgemeinschaft Osterreich Entomologen, 27(1/2), 33–38.
 Schedl, K.E., 1975: Die Unterfamilie Scolytoplatypinae (Coleoptera, Scolytoidea). 307 Beitrag zur Morphologie und Systematik der Scolytoidea. Entomologische Abhandlungen Staatliches Museum für Tierkunde in Dresden, 40(7), 199–267.
 Schedl, K.E., 1975: New Scolytidae and Platypodidae from Papua New Guinea (Coleoptera). 315 Contribution to the Morphology and Taxonomy of the Scolytoidea. Reichenbachia, 15, 215–232.
 Schedl, K.E., 1975: Scolytidae und Platypodidae (Coleoptera) aus Papua-Neu-Guinea. Folia Entomologica Hungarica, 28(2), 345–348.

1978
 Schedl, K.E., 1978: Die Typen der Sammlung Schedl Familie Platypodidae (Coleoptera). Kataloge der wissenschaftlichen Sammlungen des Naturhistorisches Museum Wien, Entomologie, 1, 1–82.

1979
 Schedl, K.E., 1979: Die Typen der Sammlung Schedl Familie Scolytidae (Coleoptera). Kataloge der wissenschaftlichen Sammlungen des Naturhistorisches Museum Wien, Entomologie, 3(2), 1–286.
 Schedl, K.E., 1979: New Scolytidae and Platypodidae from Papua New Guinea V. (Coleoptera). 311 Contribution. Faunistische Abhandlungen, 7, 95–120.
 Schedl, K.E., 1979: Zur Synonymie der Borkenkäfer, XXIX. 345 Beitrag. Entomologischen Arbeiten aus dem Museum G. Frey, 28, 119–132.
 Schedl, K.E., 1979: Scolytidae aus West Irian. 338 Beitrag zur Morphologie und Systematik der Scolytoidea. Entomologische Blätter , 74(3), 158.

1980
 Schedl, K.E., 1980: Zur Synonymie der Borkenkäfer, 28. 339 Beitrag. Zeitschrift der Arbeitsgemeinschaft Osterreich Entomologen, 31(3/4), 117–124.

References

External links 
 

1898 births
1979 deaths
Austrian entomologists
Coleopterists
20th-century Austrian zoologists